Erythromycin/isotretinoin (trade name Isotrexin) is a topical gel with two active ingredients: erythromycin 2% w/w and isotretinoin 0.05% w/w with a primary indication for the treatment of moderate acne vulgaris.

Isotretinoin is a pharmaceutical derivative of retinoic acid (a metabolite of vitamin A). Its mechanism of action is believed to involve reduction in the amount of sebum produced by sebaceous glands on the skin's surface.

Erythromycin is a bacteriostatic macrolide antibiotic used to treat bacterial infections, including the inhibition of bacteria linked with acne, such Cutibacterium acnes. The mechanism of action is poorly understood.

Side effects 
Erythromycin/isotretinoin may cause a number of side effects, ranging from very common to rare. Most side effects affect the skin and have only a local effect to the place of application. Some of the side effects are related to vitamin A toxicity.

References

Anti-acne preparations
Combination drugs
Isotretinoin